Al-Musta'in Billah was the regnal name of the twelfth Abbasid Caliph ruling from 862 to 866. 

The title was also used by:

 Sulayman ibn al-Hakam, the fifth caliph of Córdoba (1009–1010, 1013–1016)
 Al-Musta'in I, the first Hudid ruler of Zaragoza (1039–1046/1049)
 Al-Musta'in II, the fourth Hudid ruler of Zaragoza (1085–1110)
 Al-Musta'in (Cairo), the tenth Caliph of Cairo (1406–1414) 
 Abu Nasr Sa'd of Granada, the twentieth sultan of Granada (1455–1462, 1462–1464)
 Abdullah of Pahang, (30 July 1959–present) also known as Al-Sultan Abdullah Ri'ayatuddin Al-Mustafa Billah Shah ibni Almarhum Sultan Haji Ahmad Shah Al-Musta'in Billah is the Malaysian Sultan of Pahang.